Winifred Edgerton (September 24, 1862 – September 6, 1951) was born in Ripon, Wisconsin.  She was the first woman to receive a degree from Columbia University and the first American woman to receive a PhD in mathematics.  She was awarded a PhD with high honors from Columbia University in 1886, by a unanimous vote of the board of trustees, after being rejected once.

Early life and education
Winifred Haring Edgerton was born in Ripon, Wisconsin on September 24, 1862. She was the only
daughter of Clara and Emmett Edgerton, who apparently were well enough off to build her a small home observatory.  She earned her B.A. degree from Wellesley College in 1883, and taught for a time at Sylvanus Reed's School.   She continued her interest in astronomy by independently using data from the Harvard observatory to calculate the orbit of the Pons-Brooks comet of 1883. She then appealed to Columbia University for permission to use their telescope. On February 4, 1884 the members of the board of trustees agreed, considering her an "exceptional case" and cautioning her "not to disturb the male students."  She was required to work as a laboratory assistant to the director of the observatory.

She studied math and astronomy at Columbia which at the time was an all-male institution. Her teachers included Professor John Krom Rees, Professor J. Howard Van Amringe and Professor William Guy Peck. After her first appeal to receive a degree was rejected by the trustees, she was advised by President Frederick A. P. Barnard to speak to each of the trustees individually. At the next meeting, she was awarded the PhD with high honors from Columbia University in 1886, by a unanimous vote. Her thesis was "Multiple Integrals and Their Geometrical Interpretation of Cartesian Geometry, in Trilinears and Triplanars, in Tangentials, in Quaternions, and in Modern Geometry; Their Analytical Interpretations in the Theory of Equations, Using Determinants, Invariants and Covariants as Instruments in the Investigation".

Mary Williams writes that "The granting of this degree was the outstanding event of the 1886 Columbia Commencement. When she was given her diploma, according to newspaper reports, there was a 'terrible round of applause which the gallant students in the body of the house kept up fully two minutes.'"

Career
Winifred taught mathematics at various institutions for several years after her graduation from Columbia. She was offered a position as professor of mathematics at Wellesley College, but declined, due to plans to marry Frederick Merrill in 1887.  Merrill, also a graduate of Columbia (1885; PhD, 1890), became a New York State geologist (1899–1904) and director of the New York State Museum. They had four children.

Merrill was also a member of a committee that petitioned Columbia University to found Barnard College in 1889. It became New York's first secular institution to award women a liberal arts degree.

In 1906 Winifred Edgerton Merrill founded the Oaksmere School for Girls, directing it until 1928, when she discontinued the school and moved to New York City.

She published and spoke on education and was a trustee of Wellesley College.  In 1919, she published a system for "translating" signatures into music. Later in life (1948–1951), Winifred worked as a librarian at the Barbizon Hotel in New York City.

On the fiftieth anniversary of her graduation from Wellesley, a portrait of Winifred Edgerton Merrill was presented to Columbia and now hangs in one of the academic buildings with the inscription, "She opened the door."

References

External links

 Biography on p. 419-424 of the Supplementary Material at AMS
Entry in The National cyclopædia of American biography, New York: J. T. White & company, 1893- v.41. p. 113.

1862 births
1951 deaths
19th-century American mathematicians
20th-century American mathematicians
Wellesley College alumni
Columbia Graduate School of Arts and Sciences alumni
People from Ripon, Wisconsin
American women mathematicians
20th-century women mathematicians
20th-century American women
19th-century American women